Yatawara is a village in Sri Lanka. It is located within Kandy District, Central Province.   It is located on the Wattegama-Matale (B462) road, about 4.5 kilometres  from Wattegama.

See also
List of towns in Central Province, Sri Lanka

External links

Populated places in Kandy District